On November 12, 2009, a collapse occurred in an illegal, privately owned gold mine in Dompoase, Ashanti Region, Ghana. Up to 30 miners were prospecting the mine when it collapsed because of a landslide. At least 18 workers were killed in the collapse, including 14 women and the owner of the mine. Officials have described the disaster as the worst mine collapse in Ghanaian history.

Police in the Ghanaian capital of Accra have launched an investigation, and are looking into the possibility of criminal negligence. The police commander in the Western Region of Ghana, Kojo Antwi Tabi, called the disaster "the biggest mining tragedy that has ever hit Ghana". He also stated that he believed the government should take more measures to control the activities conducted in the mines. Safety measures in the mine were described as "poor or nonexistent".

The mine owner had contracted 6 men and 24 women to work the mine. The men performed the mining and digging, while the women carried out the soil for sorting. A 27-year-old survivor in a hospital claimed that she was the last person out of the mine and stated that everyone would have escaped were it not for a large tree that fell during the landslide.

Police are searching for additional victims trapped in the mine. Because of the possibility of another collapse, rescue efforts remain extremely dangerous. It has been difficult to identify the bodies of the dead as well, as most of the miners were not from Ghana.

See also
 Galamsey

References

Mining disasters in Ghana
2009 in Ghana
2009 mining disasters
Illegal mining
2009 disasters in Ghana